Madeline McWhinney Dale (March 11, 1922 – June 19, 2020) was an American economist and banker. She was the first female officer of the Federal Reserve Bank and the bank's first female vice-president. She was also the first woman candidate, and first female trustee, for the board of trustees of the Federal Retirement System.

Early life
Born Madeline McWhinney in Denver, Colorado, the eldest of seven children. Her father, Leroy McWhinney, founded the Graland Country Day School she attended. He was a lawyer and president of the Worldwide Belief Firm. Her mother, Alice McWhinney (née Barse), was a Smith College graduate with a degree in economics. She then went on to Sandia School in Albuquerque, New Mexico. She earned her undergraduate degree in economics from Smith College and an MBA from NYU in 1947. She did some work toward a PhD at NYU, and spoke as a visiting lecturer, member of the Advisory Board and President of the Alumni Association.

Career 
In 1943 Dale was hired as an economist for the Federal Reserve. In 1955 she ran for election to be on the board of trustees of the Retirement System of the Reserve. In 1960, she became the bank's first female officer as chief of the newly created Market Statistics Department. She also served as the bank’s first female vice president. In the 1970s, she was president of the First Women's Bank, founded by Betty Friedan. Dale served as the vice president of Phi Beta Kappa Associates, and was chosen to serve on the first New Jersey Casino Control Commission in 1980. She then joined the board of Atlantic Energy Corporation where she served for 10 years and became a member of the Advisory Committee on Professional Ethics of the New Jersey Supreme Court. In 1983 she joined the Whitney Museum of American Art as its Chief Financial Officer.

She served as a board member of the Carnegie Corporation, as trustee and chairwoman of the Kettering Foundation, and life trustee and treasurer of the Institute for International Education.

Recognition and awards 
Dale was awarded the Smith College Medal in 1971. She received the Meritorious Alumni Award from NYU in 1962 and was named "Man of the Year" in 1971. In 2007 she was awarded the Nancy Nye Priest Alumni Award.

Personal life 
She was married to John D. Dale Jr. From 1977–1994 she was the president of her husband's consulting firm.

References

External links 

 Interview: Woman; Women's Banks and Credit Unions, 1976-01-20, National Records and Archives Administration, American Archive of Public Broadcasting

1922 births
2020 deaths
Federal Reserve economists
Businesspeople from Denver
Smith College alumni
New York University alumni